Inter-School Christian Fellowship (ISCF) or Inter-Scholastic Christian Fellowship is a Christian youth ministry that works with students within high schools. ISCF groups are often supported by external evangelical Christian organisations and churches – examples including the International Fellowship of Evangelical Students, the Scripture Union, and local churches. ISCF operates in countries including Australia, Canada, Indonesia, Philippines and the United States of America.

ISCF groups are often voluntarily led by senior students and usually have the support and guidance of an older mentor, youth pastor, or a patron teacher. ISCF groups mainly meet during lunchtime.

Australia

Activities
Some typical activities of an ISCF program include:
Talks by students and guest-speakers (e.g. Pastors)
Bible studies
Singing
Games
Barbecues
Camps
Combined gatherings and socials with ISCF groups from other schools

In supporting students wishing to be better equipped for serving in ISCF, there are various training programmes available, for instance the annual "ISCF Leadership Conference" (Scripture Union NSW), or "Rising Leaders" (part of the Next Generation conference, hosted by the Katoomba Christian Convention Center).

Schools in Australia
Through the post-war (WWII) period ISCF operated in several government high schools, including Balwyn High School in Victoria, where it was particularly active through the 1960s. The numbers of government schools with an ISCF declined with a general decrease in religious activities in government schools. 
Some Australian high schools with ISCF groups include:
Armidale High School
Baulkham Hills High School
Brisbane Boys' College
Brisbane Grammar School
Caringbah High School
Carlingford High School
Cheltenham Girls High School
Cherrybrook Technology High School
Chatswood High School
Engadine High School
Epping Boys' High School
Figtree High School
Hornsby Girls High School
Heathcote High School
James Ruse Agricultural High School
Kingsgrove High School
North Sydney Boys High School
North Sydney Girls High School
Moreton Bay College
Normanhurst Boys High School
Muirfield High School
Ravenswood School for Girls
Sefton High School
Somerville House
St George Girls High School
St Margaret's Anglican Girls School
St Aidan's Anglican Girls' School
Sydney Boys High School
Sydney Girls High School
Sydney Technical College
Sydney Technical High School

See also
 International Sport Combat Federation of Mixed Martial Arts

References

External links
Inter Varsity Christian Fellowship (Canada)
ISCF Canada
ISCF Jamaica
Scripture Union International
Scripture Union NSW

Christian youth organizations
Christian organisations based in Australia
Christianity in Jamaica
Student societies in Australia
Student societies in Jamaica
Evangelical parachurch organizations
Christian education in Australia